Nivôse (also Nivose) was the fourth month in the French Republican Calendar. The month was named after the Latin word nivosus, which means snowy.

Nivôse was the first month of the winter quarter (mois d'hiver). It started between 21 and 23 December. It ended between 19 and 21 January. It follows the Frimaire and precedes the Pluviôse.

The new names for the calendar were suggested by Fabre d'Églantine on 24 October 1793. On 24 November the National Convention accepted the names with minor changes. So it was decided to omit the circumflex (accent circonflexe) in the names of the winter months. So the month was named Nivose instead of Nivôse. Historiography still prefers the spelling
Nivôse.

Day name table 

Like all months in the French Republican Calendar, Nivôse lasted 30 days and was divided into three 10-day weeks called décades (decades). The 5th (Quintidi) day of every decade was named after a domestic animal, the 10th day (Decadi) after an agricultural tool (Decadi). Different from the other months the rest of the days were not named after an agricultural plant, but after a mineral or animal substance. Fabre d'Églantine says about this topic:
"In Nivôse earth is sealed and usually covered with snow. At this time earth is resting and there are no herbal agriculture products to characterize this month. We rather took names of animal and mineral substances of agricultural use."

Conversion table

External links 
 Winter Quarter of Year II (facsimile)
 Fabre d’Églantine: Rapport sur le calendrier révolutionnaire (French)

French Republican calendar
December
January

sv:Franska revolutionskalendern#Månaderna